Ambika Sukumaran Nair is an Indian actress best known for her work in Malayalam cinema during the 1950s and 1960s. She belongs to Travancore Royal family and grand daughter of great painter Raja Ravi Varma, She is a close relative of the Travancore Sisters; Lalitha, Padmini and Ragini, and also Shobana, Vineeth, Krishna and Sukumari. Ambika also was initiated to go along that path and she debuted in Udaya Studio's film Visappinte Vili in 1952 she is also the first herion of Premnazir. In 1968, she acted as the lead actress in the first full-length comedy in Malayalam cinema Viruthan Shanku, directed by P. Venu. She acted in more than 80 movies.

Personal life
She married Sukumaran and left cinema, settling in the US. She has two daughters. She is a trained Bharatanatyam dancer. She ran a dance school in New Jersey before retiring.

Partial filmography

Malayalam

 Thanka Bhasma Kuriyitta Thamburatty (2019) as Herself in photo
 Tharangal (2014)  as Herself in photo
 Naayika (2011)  as Herself in video footage
 Allahu Akbar (1977)
 Check Post (1974)
 Kalippaava (1972)
 Moonu Pookkal (1971) as Valsala
 Sthree (1970) as Vasanthi
 Ara Nazhika Neram (1970) as Kuttiyamma
 Sabarimala Sree Dharmashastha (1970)
 Nadhi (1969) as Leela
 Virunnukari (1969) as Malathi
 Mooladhanam (1969) as Malathi
 Velliyazhcha (1969) as Chitra
 Vilakkappetta Bandhangal (1969)
 Kuruthikkalam (1969)
 Aparaadhini (1968)
 Adhyaapika (1968) as Thankamma
 Vazhi Pizhacha Santhathi (1968)
 Midumidukki (1968) as Sarasu
 Viruthan Shanku (1968) as Kunjikkavu
 Collector Malathy (1967) as Indu
 N.G.O (1967)
 Chekuthante Kotta (1967)
 Kudumbam (1967) as Radha
 Anarkali (1966) as Jodhabhai
 Pinchuhridayam (1966) as Malathy
 Penmakkal (1966) as Kamala
 Poochakkanni (1966)
 Kayamkulam Kochunni (1966)
 Kusrithikkuttan (1966) as Lakshmi
 Koottukar (1966) as Khadeeja
 Thankakudam (1965) as Suhara
 Kuppivala (1965) as Khadeeja
 Sarpakadu (1965) as Nagaprabha
 Thommante Makkal (1965) as Soshamma
 Kadathukaran (1965) as Thankamma
 Shyamala Chechi (1965) as Shyamala
 Subaidha (1965) as Subaida
 Devatha (1965) as Ammini
 Jeevitha Yaathra (1965) as Lakshmi
 Chettathi (1965) as Nirmala
 Kathirunna Nikah (1965) as Wahida
 Ammu (1965) as Ammu
 Shree Guruvayoorappan (1964) as Manjula
 Devaalayam (1964) as Sumathi
 Aadya Kiranangal (1964) as Gracy
 Omanakuttan (1964) as Bhavani
 Pazhassi Raja (1964)
 Kutti Kuppayam (1964) as Subaida
 Thacholi Othenan (1964) as Kunji Kunki
 Kalanju Kittiya Thankam (1964) as Girija
 School Master (1964) as Vishalam
 Oraal Koodi Kallanaayi (1964) as Devaki
 Nithya Kanyaka (1963) as Nalini
 Sathyabhaama (1963) as Sathyabhama
 Chilamboli (1963) as Sumangala 
 Ammaye Kaanaan (1963) as Madhavi
 Susheela (1963) as Nalini
 Moodupadam (1963) as Amina
 Ninamaninja Kalpadukal (1963) as Thankamma
 Swargarajyam (1962) as Baby
 Snehadeepam (1962) as Vilasini
 Veluthambi Dalawa (1962) as Seethalakshmi
 Sreekovil (1962) as Radha
 Kannum Karalum (1962) as Sarala
 Krishna Kuchela (1961) as Sathyabhama
 Kandam Becha Kottu (1961) as Kunju Bivi
 Ummini Thanka (1961) as Dancer
 Sabarimala Ayyappan (1961) as Panthalam Rani
 Christmas Rathri (1961) as Gracy
 Arappavan (1961) as Kalyani
 Bhakta Kuchela (1961 film) as Rukmini
 Mudiyanaya Puthran (1961) as Radha
 Sthreehridayam (1960)
 Aana Valarthiya Vanampaadi (1959)
 Naadodikal (1959) as Sharadha
 Koodappirappu (1956) as Parvathi
 Vishappinte Vili (1952) as Dancer

Tamil
 Ponni (1953) as Dancer 
 Rambaiyin Kaadhal (1956) as Menaka 
 Raja Rani (1956) as Dancer 
 Mathar Kula Manikkam (1956) as Dancer
 Pudhu Vazhvu (1957) 
 Yaanai Valartha Vanampadi (1959) 
 Rathinapuri Ilavarasi (1960)
 Ivan Avanethan (1960) 
 Sri Valli (1961) 
 Naan Vanangum Dheivam (1963)
 Kandhan Karunai (1967) as Padumakomalai
 Thillana Mohanambal (1968) as Maragatham

Telugu
Charana Daasi (1956) as Dancer 
 Dakshayagnam (1962) as Urvashi
 Rani Ratnaprabha (1962) as Dancer

Kannada
 Abba Aa Hudugi (1959) as Dancer

Hindi
  Royal Mail (1963) as Rajkumari

TV Shows - Guest
 Sthree (ACV)
 Morning Guest (Media One)
 Interview (Manorama News)
 Rangoli (Doordarshan Malayalam)
 Innalathe Tharam (Amrita TV)
 Film Views

Dramas
 Kuttavum Shikshayum

References

External links

Actresses in Malayalam cinema
20th-century Indian actresses
Actresses from Kerala
Indian film actresses
Living people
Year of birth missing (living people)
Actresses in Tamil cinema
Actresses in Telugu cinema
Actresses in Kannada cinema
Actresses in Hindi cinema